Kendall S. Harmon (born 1960), is a priest of the Anglican Church in North America and formerly of the Episcopal Church. He is known for his conservative writings on matters related to homosexuality and the Anglican church and his role in the schism of the Episcopal Church.

Early life and education 
Harmon studied at Bowdoin College and Regent College in Vancouver, Canada and the Trinity School for Ministry in Ambridge, Pennsylvania.

In 1993, he received a doctoral degree from Oxford University for his dissertation on aspects of the doctrine of Hell in regards to Universalism.

Career 
Harmon campaigned against the election of Barbara Harris as bishop of the Diocese of Massachusetts in 1988. He opined on Harris, a black woman, campaigning that she was angry, uneducated, inexperienced, and extremist.

In disagreement with Edward Fudge's book The Fire That Consumes, Harmon presented the paper "The Case against Conditionalism: A Response to Edward William Fudge" at the Fourth Edinburgh Conference on Christian Dogmatics in 1991.

Harmon worked at Holy Comforter in Sumter, South Carolina in the 1980s and St. Paul's Episcopal Church in Summerville, South Carolina in the 1990s.

Harmon wrote a booklet, A Deeply Disturbing Document: A Comprehensive Critique of the Episcopal Church Curriculum Sexuality: A Divine Gift, criticizing the Episcopal educational booklet Sexuality: A Divine Gift, A Sacramental Approach to Human Sexuality and Family Life and was often quoted in the news after the booklet's circulation. Bishop C. Fitzsimmons Allison credited Harmon with the rejection of Sexuality: A Divine Gift by the Episcopal General Convention.

In 2002, Harmon began serving as Canon Theologian for the Anglican Diocese of South Carolina. He also served as the Assistant Rector for Yonges Island, Christ St. Paul's Church.

Harmon has frequently written and commented on homosexuality, which he has deemed "unnatural," with conservative Christian views. Harmon criticized the ordination of Robert Williams in "Should a Practicing Homosexual be Ordained in the Episcopal Church Today?," an editorial published in church newsletter Jubilate Deo in February 1990. His 2005 article "Anglicanism at the Crossroads", in which he detailed a conservative Christian view of homosexuality's incompatibility with biblical scripture, appeared in The Guardian. 

He decried the election of homosexual bishops Gene Robinson in 2003 and Mary Douglas Glasspool in 2009. Following the election of Robinson at the 2003 General Convention of the Episcopal Church, he read a statement on behalf of the conservatives that claimed that the church had left the Anglican faith. Harmon call for the intervention of the Archbishop of Canterbury.

In 2007, Rowan Williams, the Archbishop of Canterbury, chaired a group that assessed the U.S. Episcopal Church's supporting for gay clergy and congregation; Harmon deemed the group's concluding report "poor".

In 2009, following the schism in the Episcopal Church that led to the formation of the Anglican Church in North America, Harmon was appointed as the Anglican Communion Development Director in the Anglican Diocese of South Carolina, where he also works in media relations. Harmon operates the blog TitusOneNine.

Personal life
He is married to a nurse practitioner named Elizabeth; they have three children.

Works
 "Should Practicing Homosexual Persons be Ordained in the Episcopal Church Today?" Shaker Heights, Ohio: Episcopalians United, 1991. [Contributor] [excerpt]
 Finally Excluded from God?: Some Twentieth Century Theological Explorations of the Problem of Hell and Universalism with Reference to the Historical Development of These Doctrines. 1993 D.Phil. from Oxford University [Dissertation]
 "Nothingness and Human Destiny: Hell in the Thought of C.S. Lewis," in David Mills, ed., The Pilgrim's Guide: C.S. Lewis and the Art of Witness (Eerdmans, 1998). . [Contributor]

References

External links 

 Official website
 Kendall Harmon - Twitter

American theologians
1960 births
Living people
American Anglican Church in North America priests
Anglican realignment people
Alumni of the University of Oxford
People from Illinois